Kathrin Freitag (born 16 April 1974) is a German former cyclist. She competed in the women's 500 metres time trial at the 2000 Summer Olympics.

References

External links
 

1974 births
Living people
German female cyclists
Olympic cyclists of Germany
Cyclists at the 2000 Summer Olympics
Cyclists from Mecklenburg-Western Pomerania
People from Mecklenburgische Seenplatte (district)
People from Bezirk Neubrandenburg